Don Maxwell (born 23 February 1971, Bridgetown, Barbados) is a Canadian cricketer. He is a right-handed batsman, and a right arm fast-medium bowler.

Maxwell made his debut for Canada on 14 February 1994 against Namibia in the 1994 ICC Trophy. He has played in three ICC Trophy tournaments for Canada in all. Maxwell made his One Day International debut for Canada against Bermuda on 17 May 2006 in Trinidad and has played three ODIs in total. In addition to the ICC Trophy and ODIs, he has represented Canada in the 2004 ICC Americas Championship, six ICC Intercontinental Cup games and on two occasions in which Canada participated in West Indian domestic one-day cricket.

Canadian cricketers
Canada One Day International cricketers
Cricketers from Bridgetown
Barbadian emigrants to Canada
1971 births
Living people
Barbadian cricketers